Dean Murray (born June 6, 1964) is an American professional basketball coach. He is the current head coach of REG of the Basketball Africa League (BAL).

Playing career 
Murray played college basketball for Appalachian State Mountaineers men's basketball team from 1985 to 1987, in a total of seven games over two seasons.

Coaching career
Murray's professional coaching career started in 2001 with the Charleston Lowgators of the NBA D-League.

Murray was the head coach of the Saitama Broncos in the Japanese Bj League in 2011. 

Murray coached Al-Muharraq SC in Bahrain in 2019.

In February 2020, he signed in Rwanda as coach of Patriots BBC, which play in the first Basketball Africa League (BAL) season. He parted ways with the team in March 2021.

In February 2023, Murray agreed to coach the REG BBC team during the 2023 BAL season.

Personal 
Murray is married to his wife who he met during his tenure as assistant coach at Charleston Southern University.

References

1964 births
Living people
American expatriate basketball people in China
American expatriate basketball people in Japan
American expatriate basketball people in Lithuania
American expatriate basketball people in South Korea
American expatriate basketball people in Taiwan
American men's basketball coaches
American men's basketball players
Anaheim Arsenal coaches
BC Neptūnas coaches
Changwon LG Sakers coaches
Columbus Riverdragons coaches
Saitama Broncos coaches
Texas Legends coaches
Formosa Dreamers head coaches

American expatriate basketball people in Rwanda